The Samwell Cave cricket is an undescribed species of insect in the family Rhaphidophoridae, which is endemic to California.

References

Rhaphidophoridae
Orthoptera of North America
Endemic fauna of California
Undescribed arthropod species
Taxonomy articles created by Polbot
Taxobox binomials not recognized by IUCN